= Jacqueline Kouwenhoven =

Member of Malawian parliament

Jacqueline Kouwenhoven is a member of parliament for Rumphi West in Malawi. Kouwenhoven's tenure began on 2014-05-20.

== Life ==
Kouwenhoven was born in the Netherlands but arrived in Africa in 1983, working in healthcare in Cameroon and Mali before setting in Malawi in 2000.

In 2018 she was serving as an independent member of parliament. She shrugged off accusations that she was "a foreigner" noting that she intended to die in Malawi.
